Loughmacrory St Teresa's (Cumann Naomh Treasa Loch Mhic Ruairí) is a Gaelic Athletic Association club based in the village of Loughmacrory in County Tyrone, Northern Ireland. Notable past players include Enda John Ward, who now resides in The Newline, Formally in Loughmacrory Park.

Honours
 Tyrone Junior Football Championship (2)
 1980, 1993

References

External links
Loughmacrory St Teresa's

Gaelic games clubs in County Tyrone
Gaelic football clubs in County Tyrone